Sayed Mekki Abbas (born January 1, 1911) was a Sudanese civil servant and economist who served as the Executive Secretary of the United Nations Economic Commission for Africa from January 1959 until October 1961. In 1963 he became Director-General of the Food and Agriculture Organization's Department of Economic and Social Affairs.

He also served as acting head of the United Nations Operation in the Congo in March 1961 for a period while Rajeshwar Dayal had been recalled to New York for consultations.

References 

1911 births
Year of death missing